Stara Zagora Zoo is a zoo located in Ayazmoto Park in Stara Zagora, Bulgaria.

Zoo Stara Zagora was established on April 26, 1957, and is situated in area in the park called "Holy Spring". It occupies an area of 70 acres.

Notes

External links
 (In Bulgarian)

Buildings and structures in Stara Zagora
Zoos in Bulgaria
Tourist attractions in Stara Zagora
Zoos established in 1957
Education in Stara Zagora